Minsoo Kang (born 1967) is a historian and writer. Currently, he is an associate professor of European intellectual history in the Department of History at the University of Missouri–St. Louis. Kang is also an expert on the history of automata in science and in fiction.

Kang has published numerous books and articles on European history. In 'Of Tales and Enigmas', a collection of his essays and short stories, Kang adopts the styles of Western genre fiction to explore his personal vision of Korean history, which creates a surrealistic landscape where histories, ideas, and legends freely and harmoniously intermingle.

Early life
Minsoo Kang was born in Seoul, South Korea, his father is a South Korean diplomat and his mother is a professor of French literature. In accordance with the international nature of his father's job, Kang grew up in Korea, Austria, New Zealand, Iran, Germany, Brunei, and other places for shorter periods. He is fluent in Korean and English, and can read in German and French.

Kang graduated from the University of Southern California in 1988 with a B.A. in Interdisciplinary Studies of History, Philosophy, and Religion; he received his M.A. and Ph.D. degrees in European History from University of California, Los Angeles in 1991 and 2004, respectively.

Academic work
Kang is an expert on the history of automata. His book Sublime Dreams of Living Machines looks at automata in the European imagination throughout history. While covering a broad history of golems, talking heads, mechanical ducks, and so forth, Kang pursues questions regarding how automata fit the historical periods that created them.

Kang is an assistant professor of Modern European history with a concentration in eighteenth and nineteenth century France, Britain, and Germany. His research focuses on intellectual and cultural history, the history of science and technology, and global history pertaining to interactions between Europeans and East Asians in the early modern period. He has also written several essays on Korean history focusing on the transition from the late Goryeo dynasty to the early Joseon.

Kang's work often explores the relationship between history and fiction. His master's thesis, The Intrusion of History: The Novels of Milan Kundera in the Context of Czechoslovak History pursued the idea of using literature for the study of history. He also studies film, historical novels, and science fiction as history.

Bibliography

Fiction and short stories
 Of Tales and Enigmas, Prime, 2006
 Three Stories: Lady Faraway, The Well of Dreams, The Dilemma of the King and the Beggar; Magazine: Lady Churchill's Rosebud Wristlet 22, 2002
A Fearful Symmetry, in Ellen Datlow, Kelly Link and Gavin J Grant eds., The Year's Best Fantasy and Horror 2007, St. Martins, New York, 2007

Nonfiction
 Visions of the Industrial Age, Ashgate, 2008
 Sublime Dreams of Living Machines: The Automaton in the European Imagination, Harvard University Press, 2011

Essays and articles
 De la Sagesse Inaboutie du Barbare: Un Erudit Confucéen Lit la vie de Saint Ignace, in Daniel S. Milo, Alain Boureau ed., Alter Histoire: Essais d’Histoire Expérimentale, Les Belles Lettres, Paris, 1991
 Review of Das Schreckliche Mädchen, in The American Historical Review 96, 4, 	1991
 Review of Hard Times and Culture - Fin de Siécle Vienna, in The American Historical 	Review 97, 4, 1992
 The Moderns: Art, Forgery, and a Postmodern Narrative of Modernism, in Robert Rosenstone ed., Revisioning History, Princeton University Press, Princeton, 	1995
 How to Keep Heaven's Mandate, The Times Literary Supplement, June 19, 1998
 Ten Short Essays on Korea, AZ 1, 1, 1999
 Gyungbok Palace: History, Controversy, Geomancy, Manoa 11, 1, 1999
 Reading Dutch, Rethinking History 4, 3, Winter 2000
 The Use of Dreaming for the Study of History, Rethinking History 5, 2, Summer 2001
 Review of John E. Wills Jr.’s 1688: A Global History, Rethinking History 5, 3, Winter 2001
 Wonders of Mathematical Magic: Lists of Automata in the Transition from Magic to 	Science, 1533–1662, Comitatus: A Journal of Medieval and Renaissance Studies 33, 2002
 Building the Sex Machine: the Subversive Fantasy of the Female Robot, Intertexts, 9, 2, 2006
 The Ambivalent Power of the Robot, Antenna: The Journal of Nature in Visual Culture, 9, March 21, 2009.
 Review of Walter L. Abramson's Embattled Avant-Gardes: Modernism's Resistance to Commodity Culture, Journal of World History, June 2009.

Honor
 The Year's Best Fantasy and Horror 2007 in Ellen Datlow, Kelly Link and Gavin J Grant eds (for short story: A Fearful Symmetry)

See also 

List of Asian American writers

References

External links
 The Ambivilant Power of the Robot
 St Louis Professor Minsoo Kang Tracks our Love Hate Relationship with Robots
 JUSTIFY YOURSELF: K.J. Bishop and Minsoo Kang

Living people
American writers of Korean descent
1967 births
University of Southern California alumni
University of California, Los Angeles alumni
University of Missouri–St. Louis people